Publish What You Fund is a global campaign for aid transparency– more and better information about aid.

Background 

Publish What You Fund is the global campaign for aid transparency. It advocates for the disclosure of timely, accessible and comparable information on aid by aid agencies and organisations, and was launched at the 2008 Accra 3-High Level Forum on Aid Effectiveness. Its main funders are the Hewlett Foundation and the Open Society Foundation.

Publish What You Fund urges donors to disclose their aid information regularly and promptly, and in a standardised format that will be comparable with other countries and accessible to all. They support greater disclosure of aid information in line with the International Aid Transparency Initiative (IATI) Standard and promote the central importance of aid transparency within international discussions on aid effectiveness and freedom of information. Their campaign for aid transparency focuses primarily on the EU, U.S. and World Bank, as the world’s largest aid donors.

In December 2011, at the 4-High Level Forum on Aid Effectiveness in Busan, the world’s most prominent development actors committed to publishing their aid information by 2015. Publish What You Fund will be working to ensure that donors redouble efforts to fulfil their commitments.

The Issue 

Aid has the power to radically transform lives. It can help lift people out of poverty and give assistance to those living in acute deprivation. But its potential is not being fully realised because we need to know more about how it is spent.

Transparency in aid is essential if aid is to truly deliver on its promise. There is currently too little readily available information about aid, undermining efforts of governments that give aid (aid donors), governments who receive aid (aid recipients) and civil society to promote development and accountability.

 Donor governments don’t know what other donors are spending or planning to spend. This is leading to the duplication of efforts in some areas and underfunding in others. Without aid transparency, donors cannot coordinate to achieve the maximum impact with their scarce resources.
 Recipient governments struggle to know how much aid is invested in their country, let alone where and how it is spent. Recipients need more information to make the most effective use of their own money alongside that of donors. When donors don’t publish their spending plans, this impedes the recipient’s ability to plan long term projects, which in turn hinders development. When recipients can’t include aid flows in their budgets and planning, it is hard for parliament and civil society to hold them to account.
 Civil society in recipient countries, including NGOs, legislators and citizens, have the right to know what aid is coming into the country and what it’s being spent on. Because aid information isn’t freely available, they are hampered in their efforts to hold governments to account. This lack of transparency can lead to waste and increases the potential for corruption.

The Aid Transparency Solution 

The starting point for ensuring that aid makes a difference is having timely, comprehensive and comparable information on who is giving what, where it is going, and the impact it is having. Information on aid needs to be regularly published and freely available if it is going to help effective spending, evaluation, and accountability.

In order to promote more effective aid, all donors need to provide their aid information in a common format that meets the needs of recipient governments and civil society. Full engagement from donors would mean that a big picture of all aid flows could be available for all to see.

Activities 

Publish What You Fund works alongside others advocating for transparency, both of aid and in other areas. The organisation’s primary advocacy targets are large donors, who can change or prevent the availability of aid information at both the technical/civil service and political level. They produce an annual Aid Transparency Index to support their advocacy efforts; in 2011, the Index showed that the aid information currently made available by donors is poor and that they all need to improve their transparency. The 2012 Aid Transparency Index is currently in development.

Publish What You Fund promotes the International Aid Transparency Initiative as offering a common standard for publishing aid information. Currently, over 40 donor and recipient governments are already signed up to IATI, and over 20 governments and organisations are publishing their information to the IATI standard.

The organisation maintains a small office in London but works with partners and networks internationally, including the Modernizing Foreign Assistance Network and InterAction in the U.S. and CONCORD’s AidWatch initiative in the EU. It carries out research and monitoring to track the progress of aid transparency in donor countries.

Principles 

Publish What You Fund was founded with four key principles:

Information on aid should be published proactively – an organisation should tell people what they are doing, when and how.
Information on aid should be timely, accessible and comparable - the information provided should be in a format that is useful.
Everyone has the right to request and receive information about aid - ensure everyone is able to access the information as and when they wish
The right of access to information about aid should be promoted - an organisation should actively promote the fact that people have this right.

See also 
Aid
Aid effectiveness
International Aid Transparency Initiative

References

Further reading
'Accountability, media and the development system: a complicated romance'

External links 
http://www.publishwhatyoufund.org
http://www.aidinfo.org
https://web.archive.org/web/20090418032648/http://www.comminit.com/en/node/289977/bbc
https://web.archive.org/web/20080201000912/http://www.okfn.org/

Humanitarian aid organizations
Transparency (behavior)